Flaim is a surname of Italian origin. Notable people with the surname include:

Eric Flaim (born 1967), American speed skater
Tony Flaim (1948–2000), Canadian blues singer

References

Surnames of Italian origin